The National Basketball Association (NBA) is a professional men's basketball league, consisting of 30 teams in North America (29 in the United States and one in Canada). The NBA was founded in New York City on June 6, 1946, as the Basketball Association of America (BAA). It adopted the name National Basketball Association at the start of the 1949–50 season when it merged with the National Basketball League (NBL). The NBA is an active member of USA Basketball, which is recognized by FIBA (a French acronym for "International Basketball Federation") as the National Governing Body (NGB) for basketball in the country. The league is considered to be one of the four major professional sports leagues of North America. There have been 15 defunct franchises in NBA history. In basketball, points are the sum of the score accumulated through free throw or field goal. The NBA introduced three-point field goals in the 1979–80 season as a bonus for field goals made from a longer distance. Karl Malone scored 36,374 points with the Utah Jazz, the most points by a player for a single franchise. Kobe Bryant leads the Los Angeles Lakers, scoring the most points in the NBA while playing for only one team in an entire career. Dirk Nowitzki of the Dallas Mavericks is second behind Bryant in scoring while playing for only one team. Oscar Robertson is the leading scorer for the Sacramento Kings franchise, playing all of his games when they were known as the Cincinnati Royals.

Scoring leaders

Statistics accurate as of March 16, 2023.

Notes

References

Scoring leaders by franchise